The 1994/95 FIS Freestyle Skiing World Cup was the sixteenth World Cup season in freestyle skiing organised by International Ski Federation. The season started on 15 December 1994 and ended on 11 March 1995. This season included four disciplines: aerials, moguls, ballet and combined. This was the last season when combined events were in world cup calendar for ladies.

Men

Aerials

Moguls

Ballet

Combined

Ladies

Aerials

Moguls

Ballet

Combined

Men's standings

Overall 

Standings after 40 races.

Moguls 

Standings after 10 races.

Aerials 

Standings after 11 races.

Ballet 

Standings after 10 races.

Combined 

Standings after 9 races.

Ladies' standings

Overall 

Standings after 40 races.

Moguls 

Standings after 10 races.

Aerials 

Standings after 11 races.

Ballet 

Standings after 10 races.

Combined 

Standings after 9 races.

References

FIS Freestyle Skiing World Cup
World Cup
World Cup